Marcic v Thames Water plc [2003] UKHL 66 is a UK enterprise law and English tort law case, concerning water in the UK.

Facts
Mr Marcic’s property in Stanmore, 92 Old Church Lane, was repeatedly flooded with "foul water" and sewage after Thames Water plc failed to maintain the sewers: "two such incidents in 1992, one in each year from 1993 to 1996, two in 1997, none in 1998, four in 1999 and four or five in 2000." Repairs had not been made because they were not profitable, rather than a lack of resources. It was argued that the right to enjoyment of property in ECHR Protocol 1, article 1, was breached.

Judgment
The House of Lords held the Water Industry Act 1991 duty to provide drainage is not absolute. It allows investments to be prioritised to benefit more customers. They rejected an argument that water companies were subject to human rights obligations. The appropriate means to enforce the duty was through Ofwat, not private law actions. Their Lordships also rejected a claim in nuisance, because a claim should go through judicial review of Ofwat. Lord Nicholls gave the first judgment. Lord Steyn agreed. Lord Hoffmann gave a second opinion, and said the following.

Lord Hope gave another opinion.

Lord Scott agreed.

See also

United Kingdom enterprise law
English tort law

Notes

References

United Kingdom enterprise case law